Santa Jeremy Ono  (born November 23, 1962) is a Canadian-American immunologist and academic administrator, currently serving as the 15th president of the University of Michigan since October 2022. 

Ono served as the 15th president of the University of British Columbia from 2016 to 2022 and the 28th president of the University of Cincinnati from 2012 to 2016. Previously as a faculty member of Johns Hopkins University, Harvard University, University College London, and Emory University, Ono contributed to the field of gene regulation in the immune system and to the understanding of inflammation in the eye.

Early life and education
Born in 1962, Santa Ono is the son of mathematician Takashi Ono, who immigrated to the United States from Japan in the late 1950s. Ono was born in Vancouver, British Columbia, Canada, where his father worked as an assistant professor of mathematics at the University of British Columbia from 1961 to 1964. As a result, Ono acquired United States citizenship by jus sanguinis and Canadian citizenship by jus soli. Ono was raised in Philadelphia, Pennsylvania and Towson, Maryland, where his father worked as a tenured professor at the University of Pennsylvania from 1964 to 1969 and at Johns Hopkins University from 1969 to 2011.

Ono received a Bachelor of Arts with a major in biological science from the University of Chicago in 1984 and a Doctor of Philosophy in experimental medicine from McGill University in Canada in 1991.

Career

Science and research 
Ono completed his postdoctoral fellowship at Harvard University supported by the Helen Hay Whitney Foundation and then held faculty positions at Johns Hopkins University, Harvard University, University College London, and Emory University. He was GlaxoSmithKline Chair of Biomedical Science and head of the department of immunology at the University College London Institute of Ophthalmology and honorary staff member at Moorfields Eye Hospital NHS Foundation Trust. From March 2006 until September 2008, he served as vice provost for academic initiatives and deputy to the provost at Emory University in Atlanta, Georgia, United States. He was promoted to senior vice provost for undergraduate education and academic affairs of Emory University in September 2008 and also served as professor of ophthalmology, medicine, pediatrics and biology. In September 2010, he became senior vice president and provost for academic affairs at the University of Cincinnati.

Ono has studied on ocular surface inflammation and the immune basis of age-related macular degeneration. His early work focused on the association of certain MHC haplotypes with susceptibility and resistance to type 1 diabetes. Using a number of recombinant and congenic rat strains, the work mapped susceptibility genes in the BB rat to the class II MHC loci. His work also showed that class I and II MHC gene products are expressed at higher levels or de novo on the insulin-producing beta cells of the islets of Langerhans. He focused much of his research in the next decade on the regulation of MHC gene expression. He showed that the different class II MHC isotypes are differentially expressed and showed that the X2-box cis-element controls this differential expression. His work also showed that the bZIP transcription factor: XBP1 forms a hetero-dimer with c-Fos. This has turned out to be relevant to the developmental control of B cell differentiation. His lab also discovered the NFX1 transcription factor and cloned both the human and murine cDNAs. This factor can bind DNA, RNA and protein via a reiterated RING finger motifs in the central domain of the polypeptide. The protein appears to have important roles in neuronal development and mRNA transport. NFX1 is also a probable E3 ubiquitin-protein ligase. These enzymes are of interest as they have been shown to participate in 3 metabolic pathways: ubiquitin mediated proteolysis, parkinson's disease, and huntington's disease. His lab also demonstrated that the non- histone chromosomal protein HMGA is required for the induction of multiple genes, including MHC genes, interferon-gamma and rhodopsin. They mapped the interaction of HMGA1a and the paired homeodomain motif within Crx and showed that these interactions help recruit such transcriptional activators to the promoter/enhancer.

Using transgenic mouse technology, they also showed (concurrently and independently of Alfredo Fusco), that fusion proteins between HMGA2 and other C terminal peptides (following chromosomal translocation) can drive the development of lipomas and generate obese mice. Further contributions in the field include the mapping of the HMGA2 promoter/enhancer.

More recently, his laboratory determined the role of beta-chemokines in mast cell-dependent inflammation in the ocular surface. The work showed that chemokines not only contribute to leukocyte recruitment, but can cooperate with other mast cell activation signals to trigger mast cell degranulation. Finally, his lab showed that certain autoantibodies might contribute to the pathogenesis or exacerbation of AMD and other rapid onset retinal degenerative diseases and may constitute useful biomarkers for the screening for AMD and its progression.

Administrative work 
At Harvard, he served as head of the Inflammation, Immunity and Transplantation Focus Group at the Schepens Eye Research Institute. There, he served on the executive committee of the Harvard Program in Immunology and on two NIH Training grants within ophthalmology (Ocular Immunology and Molecular Bases of Eye Diseases). He worked with the late president J. Wayne Streilein and COO Ken Trevett and others in developing a strategic plan for the Schepens Eye Research Institute at Harvard and helped attract funding from entities such as the Markey Charitable Trust and the Fidelity Investments.

Ono was then recruited to University College London to the Cumberlege Chair and then as GSK Professor. Major funding from the Wellcome Trust, Fight for Sight, and GSK supported the development of a new immunology division at the University College London-Institute of Ophthalmology which grew to 27 members. While at UCL, he also took on administrative duties including as associate dean of students and as a member of the University College London Council (the university's governing board).

In 2006, Ono moved to Emory University as senior vice provost for undergraduate education and academic affairs. He had oversight of student enrollment activities, certain aspects of academic affairs and other responsibilities related to initiatives within the university strategic plan.

In June 2010, he was named senior vice president for academic affairs and university provost at the University of Cincinnati, with oversight of budgets, personnel, and planning. During that time, he helped lead major initiatives, including Phase I of the university's Academic Master Plan which was released on April 11, 2011.

In 2012, Ono was named the 28th president of the University of Cincinnati, and became the first Asian-American president of that university and in the state of Ohio. At the University of Cincinnati, Ono lead the implementation of the Academic Master Plan that invested $100 million into academics at the institution, including strengthening advising, the Honors Program and Study Abroad. During his tenure the university completed a $1 billion capital campaign 5 months ahead of schedule. Considerable investment in the campus and surrounding area occurred during his tenure, including renovations of 6 colleges and of Nippert Stadium and Fifth Third Arena. U Square at the Loop, a $78 million mixed use development was opened during his presidency. The University of Cincinnati also invested heavily in faculty recruitment, bringing more than 300 new faculty to the university in cluster hires.

Inside Higher Education named Ono America's most notable university president in 2015. Upworthy has profiled him as one of 9 high-profile CEOs in the world who exemplify servant leadership.

On June 15, 2016, Ono was named the 15th president and vice chancellor of the University of British Columbia in Canada, effective August 15. He was re-appointed for a second five-year term on August 11, 2020.

On July 13, 2022, Ono was named the 15th president of the University of Michigan in the United States. He became the first Asian American to lead the university when his five-year term began.

Public communications 
Ono has written on research and innovation, college rankings, healthcare, STEM education, diversity, social media, and more.

Ono has also reached out to the public by giving talks at K–12 schools in the US, the UK and Canada and to the general public at the Royal Institution of Great Britain, where he gave talks to K–12 students in the Student Education program and to adult audiences in the Talking Points Evening Lecture Series. He has also served as an invited panelist to discuss the Reith Lectures at Windsor Castle on BBC Radio 4.

He has spoken and written frequently on the issue of mental health in adolescents and young adults and advocated for enhanced funding for identifying at-risk youth and for early mental health interventions.

Honors and awards
Ono received an honorary doctorate degree from Chiba University in Japan in 2016 and an honorary doctor of divinity from the Vancouver School of Theology of the University of British Columbia in 2020.

Ono is the recipient of the Pharmacia International Award in Allergy Research (the top international prize awarded to inflammation researchers under the age of 40), a Helen Hay Whitney Fellowship, the American Diabetes Association Career Development Award, the Arthritis Foundation Investigator Award, a Lucille P. Markey Charitable Trust Award, the Medal in Bronze from Osaka City University and the Roche Award presented at University of Texas Medical Branch.

In 2016, he was awarded the Reginald Wilson Diversity Leadership Award from the American Council on Education and the NAAAP100 Award from the National Association of Asian American Professionals. In 2017, he received a Professional Achievement Award from the University of Chicago Alumni Association. He has been recognized as an outstanding mentor at Phi Beta Kappa ceremonies and received the JW McConnell Award for Potential in Teaching at McGill University.

Ono was elected into the American Academy of Arts & Sciences in 2022  He has also been elected a fellow of the American Association for the Advancement of Science, the National Academy of Inventors, the Johns Hopkins Society of Scholars, the Royal Society of Medicine, the Royal Society of Chemistry and Fellow of the British Association for the Advancement of Science. He was elected International Fellow, American Academy of Allergy, Asthma, and Immunology and of the Collegium Internationale Allergologicum and in 2017 the Canadian Academy of Health Sciences. He has been a member of the Faculty of 1000 since 2003.

He has delivered plenary or major lectures at: the International Congress of Immunology, the International Congress of Eye Research, the Annual Meetings of ARVO and AAAAI and the Kyoto Cornea Conference. Ono has been a Japan Society for the Promotion of Science Visiting Professor at Kyoto University and a Genentech Visiting Professor at the University of Cincinnati.

Advisory roles
On January 23, 2017, Ono was appointed chief advisor of the British Columbia Innovation Network and a member of the British Columbia Technology Council.

Ono has served on the governing bodies/board of trustees of University College London, Intervarsity Christian Fellowship US, World Affairs Council of Cincinnati, Alois Alzheimer Center, Strive for College, the Japan America Society, the Taft Center at University of Cincinnati, the Cincinnati Symphony Orchestra, University of Cincinnati Foundation and Trent School Cockfosters, Church of England. He has served ex officio on the Presidential Advisory Committee at Emory University. He is a founding member of the board of the Posse Foundation, Atlanta and has served on the Medical & Scientific Advisory Board of the Tear Film and Ocular Surface Society (TFOS) the Medical Advisory Board and College of Experts of the Medical Research Council, UK and the IMS and HAI study sections of the US National Institutes of Health. Ono has served on the Council of the Intervarsity Christian Fellowship of Georgia and the selection committee for the Jack Kent Cooke Foundation National Graduate Scholarships.

He has served as associate editor of Immunology and the Journal of Leukocyte Biology and on the editorial boards of the Journal of Biological Chemistry, the Journal of Immunology and the Journal of Allergy and Clinical Immunology. He chaired the Novartis Foundation Symposium in 2004 and has participated in three Keck Futures Initiatives of the United States National Academy of Sciences.

At Emory, he also served as the faculty advisor for Emory Christian Fellowship and the Alpha Theta chapter of Alpha Tau Omega fraternity. He was elected to the national board of directors of Alpha Tau Omega in 2014.

Personal life 
Santa Ono was named after Santaro, a Japanese folk story character. Ono is a practicing Anglican and has served as a Lay Eucharistic Minister.

Ono met Gwendolyn "Wendy" Yip at McGill University in 1985; Yip was in her undergraduate senior year when Ono came to the university to complete his PhD work. The pair married in 1989 and have two daughters together.

Wendy Yip received a Bachelor of Science with a major in immunology from McGill University in 1988 and a Juris Doctor from Boston University in 1991. Her father is Gar Lam Yip, a Chinese Canadian professor of electrical and computer engineering at McGill University; her mother is Alice Chan-Yip, a Chinese Canadian pediatrician based in Montreal and a former board member with the Montreal Chinese Hospital.

References

External links
 

1962 births
Living people
20th-century Canadian scientists
21st-century Canadian scientists
Academics of University College London
American academics of Japanese descent
American immunologists
Canadian expatriate academics in the United States
Canadian immunologists
Canadian people of Japanese descent
Canadian Anglicans
Canadian university and college chief executives
GSK plc people
Harvard University alumni
Harvard University faculty
Johns Hopkins University faculty
McGill University alumni
People from Towson, Maryland
Presidents of the University of British Columbia
Presidents of the University of Cincinnati
Scientists from Baltimore
Scientists from Philadelphia
Scientists from Vancouver
Towson High School alumni
Academic staff of the University of British Columbia
University of Chicago alumni
Fellows of the Royal Society of Medicine
Fellows of the Royal Society of Chemistry
Fellows of the American Academy of Arts and Sciences
Fellows of the American Association for the Advancement of Science